An instant answer is an answer supplied by a search engine in response to a search query, without the user having to navigate away from the search results.

Instant answers have been used by many search engines, such as Google, DuckDuckGo, Bing, and AOL.

Relative location
The relative location of an instant answer is usually located to the right of the search results. This is true for many search engines, such as Google, Yahoo, and AOL.
Instant answers can also be located in other areas. For example, in DuckDuckGo, the instant answers are located directly below the search bar and above the search results.

DuckDuckGo instant answers
DuckDuckGo allows its users to create custom instant answers.

References

Internet search engines